The X Factor is the Greek version of The X Factor, a show originating in the United Kingdom. It is a television music talent show contested by aspiring pop singers drawn from public auditions.

Auditions are held in Greece in the cities of Athens and Thessaloniki, as well as in Cyprus in the city of Nicosia. Auditions for the third X Factor were also held in New York City. Applicants from the Greek diaspora are also accepted.

The show was broadcast live in Greece and Cyprus, as well as abroad via ANT1's international stations, for the first three seasons. For the fourth and fifth season was broadcast live in Greece via Skai TV and in Cyprus via Sigma TV. The sixth season was broadcast live in Greece via Open TV and in Cyprus via Omega. The seventh season began airing on 18 March 2022 on Mega Channel and on Alpha TV Cyprus.

The winners of the show are: in the 1st season was Loukas Yorkas, in the 2nd was Stavros Michalakakos, in the 3rd was Harry Antoniou, in the 4th was Andreas Leontas, in the 5th was Panagiotis Koufogiannis , in the 6th was Giannis Grosis and in the 7th was Katerina Lazaridou.

Stages
There are four stages to the competition:
Stage 1: Judges' auditions – either in an audition room (series 1–3, 5, 7) or an arena (series 4, 6)
Stage 2: Bootcamp
Stage 3: Judges Houses (Series 1–3)
Stage 3: Four-Chair Challenge (Series 4–7)
Stage 4: Live Shows (Finals)

Judges and presenters

Series overview
To date, five series have been broadcast, as summarised below.

 Contestant in "Nikos Mouratidis"
 Contestant in "Katarina Gagaki"
 Contestant in "George Levendis"
 Contestant in "Giorgos Theofanous" 
 Contestant in "Tamta"
 Contestant in "Peggy Zina"
 Contestant in "Thodoris Marantinis"
 Contestant in "Babis Stokas"
 Contestant in "Giorgos Papadopoulos"
 Contestant in "Giorgos Mazonakis"
 Contestant in "Christos Mastoras"
 Contestant in "Melina Aslanidou"
 Contestant in "Michael Tsaousopoulos"
 Contestant in "Mariza Rizou"
 Contestant in "Michalis Kouinelis"
 Contestant in "Stelios Rokkos"

Judges' categories and their contestants

Key:

 – Winning judge/category. Winners are in bold, other contestants in small font.

Series overview

Series 1 (2008–2009)

The first series of the Greek X Factor started airing in October 2008 on ANT1 and was hosted by singer Sakis Rouvas.  The judges were Giorgos Levendis, songwriter Giorgos Theofanous, marketing executive of ANT1 TV, Katerina Gagaki and music critic Nikos Mouratidis.

The winner of the 1st X-Factor was Loukas Yorkas from Cyprus who released his debut EP album in September 2009.

Series 2 (2009–2010)

A second series of X Factor was broadcasteby ANT1 TV. The live shows debuted on October 30. 
The host and the judges remain the same as in the first series. The winner of the 2nd X-Factor was Stavros Michalakakos from Cyprus.

Series 3 (2010–2011)
                                                                                          
A third season of X Factor was broadcast from October 2010 to February 2011. The third series of X Factor was won by Haris Antoniou from Cyprus. The program was broadcast by ANT1 TV and the host and the judges remained the same as the previous year.

Series 4 (2016)

A fourth season of X Factor was broadcast from 4 April to  8 July 2016 on Skai TV. The host Sakis Rouvas remained with Evaggelia Aravani in backstage. Giorgos Theofanous remained from the judges of the past seasons with Peggy Zina, Tamta and Thodoris Marantinis from Onirama being the new judges. The winner of this series was Andreas Leontas from Cyprus.

Series 5 (2017)

A fifth season of X Factor was broadcast from April 27 to July 20, 2017 on Skai TV. The host Sakis Rouvas remained with Evaggelia Aravani in backstage. Tamta remained from the judges of the past seasons with Giorgos Mazonakis, Giorgos Papadopoulos and Babis Stokas being the new judges. The winner of this series was Panagiotis Koufogiannis from Cyprus.

Series 6 (2019)

A sixth season of X Factor began broadcast from 11 September 2019 on Open TV. The judges are Giorgos Theofanous, who returned for his fifth series as judge, former The Voice of Greece coach Melina Aslanidou, former Rising Star judge Christos Mastoras and Athens DeeJay Michael Tsaousopoulos. Despina Vandi will be the host, replacing Sakis Rouvas. Aris Makris is presenting the Backstage of Live Shows, replacing Evaggelia Aravani. This was the first edition in which a contenstant from Greece managed to win as in all previous editions the winner was a singer coming from Cyprus.

Series 7 (2022)

A seventh season of The X Factor began broadcast from 18 March 2022 on Mega Channel. Christos Mastoras, returned for his second season as judge, and with the three new judges, Mariza Rizou, Stelios Rokkos‎ and Michalis Kouinelis. Andreas Georgiou hosted the live shows. Ilias Bogdanos and Katerina Lioliou were presenting the backstage of Live Shows.

See also
Greek Idol
The Voice of Greece

External links
Official Website (Open TV)
Official Website (Mega Channel)

References

ANT1 original programming
Skai TV original programming
Open TV original programming
Mega Channel original programming
2008 Greek television series debuts
2000s Greek television series
2010s Greek television series
Greek reality television series
Greek music television series
Greece
Television shows set in Athens
Television series by Fremantle (company)
Greek television series based on British television series